Deivan Javier Valencia Hernández (born ) is a Colombian male weightlifter, competing in the 105 kg category and representing Colombia at international competitions. He participated at the 1996 Summer Olympics in the 99 kg event. He competed at world championships, most recently at the 1998 World Weightlifting Championships.

Major results

References

External links
 

1976 births
Living people
Colombian male weightlifters
Weightlifters at the 1996 Summer Olympics
Olympic weightlifters of Colombia
Place of birth missing (living people)
20th-century Colombian people
21st-century Colombian people